Mag Rack (formerly Lifeskool) is a Video on Demand (VoD) television channel.  Its primary focus is providing viewers with informational programs when they want them. These programs range from 'how to' programs to programs that spotlight past and present products.

The service started off as a 24-hour Catholic channel at the request of James Dolan.  It soon grew into a multi-show on demand channel.  Most of its early shows were based on unconventional topics such as: birdwatching, Catholicism, and healthy living.  Soon after, it gravitated towards shows that brought in a larger audience such as: cooking instruction, car shows, fitness, and yoga.

In November 2007, it became 'Lifeskool, but after 8 months, it became Mag Rack once again.

The majority of Mag Rack's programming is acquired through other production companies or through syndication.  

Mag Rack was part of Rainbow Media Holdings, Inc., a subsidiary of Cablevision.  It was acquired by two entrepreneurs, Joe Covey and Matthew Davidge in October, 2008. In 2017, Covey and Davidge sold Mag Rack to Grace Creek Media.

Programming
24seven Gamer
Art of Basketry
Auto Access
Aviator's World
Buff Fitness
Celebrating Dogs
Classic Cars
Cook With the Pros
Destination: Nature
Guitar Xpress
History of Art
Inside Weddings
Let's Dance
Let's Go Garden
In Living Color
Katie Brown @ Home
Living With
Mag Rack Kids Club
Mag Rack: Showcase
Eebee's Adventures
Mama Gena's School of Womanly Arts
Maximum Science
Mission Space
Motorcycle Freedom
Paloozaville
Personal Trainer
Photography Close Up
Pilates
Road Rage
Shakespeare
Smart Carb Gourmet
Steve Schirripa's Hungry
Tennis Zone
The Bible & You
The Pet Shop with Marc Morrone
Total Ski
Total Snowboard
Traveler's Guide
Turning Tricks with Justin Willman Kredible
Wild Wheels
Yoga Retreat
Your Next Car

References

External links
Mag Rack Entertainment

Video on demand services
AMC Networks